Mesoxalic acid, also called oxomalonic acid or ketomalonic acid, is an organic compound with formula C3H2O5 or HO−(C=O)3−OH.

Mesoxalic acid is both a dicarboxylic acid and a ketonic acid. It readily loses two protons to yield the divalent anion , called mesoxalate, oxomalonate, or ketomalonate. These terms are also used for salts containing this anion, such as sodium mesoxalate, Na2C3O5; and for esters containing the −C3O5− or −O−(C=O)3−O− moiety, such as diethyl mesoxalate, (C2H5)2C3O5. Mesoxalate is one of the oxocarbon anions, which (like carbonate  and oxalate ) consist solely of carbon and oxygen.

Mesoxalic acid readily absorbs and reacts with water to form a product commonly called "mesoxalic acid monohydrate", more properly dihydroxymalonic acid, HO−(C=O)−C(OH)2−(C=O)−OH. In product catalogs and other contexts, the terms "mesoxalic acid", "oxomalonic acid" and so on often refer to this "hydrated" compound. In particular, the product traded as "sodium mesoxalate monohydrate" is almost always sodium dihydroxymalonate.

Synthesis
Mesoxalic acid can be obtained synthetically by hydrolysis of alloxan with baryta water, by warming caffuric acid with lead acetate solution, or from glyceryl diacetate and concentrated nitric acid in the cold.  The product can be obtained also by oxidation of tartronic acid or glycerol.  Since they are carried out in water, these procedures generally give the dihydroxy derivative.

It is also prepared by the oxidation of glycerol with the help of bismuth(III) nitrate.

See also
Malonic acid

References

Dicarboxylic acids
Deliquescent substances
Alpha-keto acids